Prime Bank may refer to:

 Prime Bank Limited, a commercial bank in Bangladesh, established in 1995
 Prime Bank (Gambia), a commercial bank in the Gambia, established in 2009 - a subsidiary of Lebanese Canadian Bank
 Prime Bank (Kenya), a commercial bank in Kenya, established in 1992
 Prime Commercial Bank Limited, Nepal
 "Prime bank fraud," a type of bank fraud 
Prime Bank Cricket Club,a List-A team in Bangladesh